Ron Hazelton (born May 29, 1942) is the host of several popular home improvement television series including most recently Ron Hazelton's HouseCalls. He was the Home Improvement Editor for ABC's Good Morning America and has hosted several shows for The History Channel.

Early life 
Hazelton was born May 29, 1942 in Binghamton, New York to Earl, a building contractor, and Wanda Hazelton.

He graduated from the Florida State University College of Business with a BS in Marketing in 1965. He was a member of the Pi Kappa Alpha fraternity and was part of the Air Force ROTC Drill team.

Early career 
After graduation, Hazelton joined US Navy Officer Candidate School for Anti-Submarine Warfare School. Hazelton was a marketing consultant in Boston. He founded a storefront restoration workshop in San Francisco called Cow Hollow Woodworks in 1978.  He sold the business in 1993.

Television career 
In 1989, Hazelton created, co-produced, and hosted a reality-based, on-location home improvement television program called The House Doctor. It ran from 1990-1997 with more than 200 episodes and 600 house visits. It originated on ABC affiliate KGO-TV in San Francisco, and aired for several years on the HGTV until 2001. He relates that he got started on television by accident: his dentist connected him with a KGO-TV producer for what became The House Doctor.

Hazelton was the Home Improvement Editor for ABC's Good Morning America from 1997-2007. Ron reported regularly on a variety of topics related to home improvement, design, repair, health, and safety.  He has been featured as a home improvement expert on The Oprah Winfrey Show, Inside Edition, Discovery Channel's Popular Mechanics, Lifetime's Our Home and The History Channel's series Modern Marvels — History of Tools, Hands on History and Save our History: Frontier Homes.

Ron Hazelton's HouseCalls is a 30-minute Tribune Entertainment nationally-syndicated home improvement show that Hazelton produces and hosts. He travels by motor home with a mobile workshop to help people with weekend DIY home projects.  As of June 2020, Ron Hazelton's HouseCalls is broadcasting season 21.

Hazelton is the founder of the website www.ronhazelton.com.

Advocacy 
Hazelton has been the national spokesperson for the Home Fire Sprinkler Coalition, a non-profit, fire safety organization, since 1997.  He received a special Appreciation Award from Home Fire Sprinkler Coalition Steering Committee member, the National Fire Sprinkler Association, for his work on behalf of the organization.

Author 
Hazelton is the author of:

 Ron Hazelton's HouseCalls: America's Most Requested Home Improvement Projects (1999, Time-Life Books)
 Plumbing Made Easy (2009, F+W Publications’ Home Basics series)
 Electrical Made Easy (2009, F+W Publications’ Home Basics series)

Marriage and children 
Hazelton is married to Lynn Robin Drasin.  At the time of their marriage (Oct. 18, 1997), Drasin was a segment producer on Good Morning America on ABC while Hazelton was the show's home improvement editor.  Drasin has since been a producer on Ron Hazelton's HouseCalls.

References

External links 
 Ron Hazelton's HouseCalls Web site at ronhazelton.com
 
 The Home Safety Council
 Ron Hazelton at Good Morning America

American television personalities
Male television personalities
Living people
1942 births